Addis Standard  is an Ethiopian monthly social, economic and political news magazine published  and distributed by Jakenn Publishing Plc, and was established in February 2011 by Tsedale Lemma. The magazine has an independent political stance. , Tsedale Lemma continued as the editor-in-chief of the magazine, which is headquartered in Addis Ababa.

Distribution
Addis Standard is distributed in Ghana, Burundi and South Sudan in addition to its native country, Ethiopia.

Repression
Addis Standard discontinued its print edition in October 2016 in response to censorship, while continuing to publish online. It resumed a monthly print edition in 2018.

During the late 2020 Tigray conflict, one of the Addis Standard editors involved in covering Tigray Region, Medihane Ekubamichael, was detained for a month. He was freed in early December 2020. In 2021 the media regulatory of the Ethiopian government had suspended Addis Standard, but later the suspension was withdrawn by the government.

References

External links
 Official website

Defunct magazines published in Ethiopia
English-language magazines
Magazines established in 2011
Magazines disestablished in 2016
Mass media in Addis Ababa
Monthly magazines
News magazines published in Africa
Online magazines with defunct print editions
Political magazines